Crosby County is a county located in the U.S. state of Texas. As of the 2020 census, its population was 5,133. The county seat is Crosbyton. The county was founded in 1876 and later organized in 1886. Both the county and its seat are named for Stephen Crosby, a land commissioner in Texas.

Crosby County, along with Lubbock and Lynn Counties, is part of the Lubbock Metropolitan Statistical Area (MSA). The Lubbock MSA and Levelland Micropolitan Statistical Area (µSA), encompassing only Hockley County, form the larger Lubbock–Levelland Combined Statistical Area.

Until the passage of a referendum to permit liquor sales, held on May 11, 2013, Crosby County had been one of 19 remaining prohibition or entirely dry counties within Texas. That same day, voters in Denver City and Yoakum County also approved separate referendums to permit liquor sales. The number of prohibition counties in Texas at that time hence dropped to 17. Part of the large Matador Ranch of West Texas extends into the county.

History
Around 11,000 BC, Paleo-Indians were the first inhabitants. Archeological artifacts indicate hunter-gatherers hunted  the mammoth, mastodon, saber-toothed cat, and giant ground sloth. Later Native American inhabitants included the Comanche.
In 1871, Ranald S. Mackenzie fought Quanah Parker and other Comanches at the Battle of Blanco Canyon. The campaign established the Mackenzie Trail used by the first settlers in Crosby County in the late 1870s.

The Texas Legislature formed Crosby County from Young and Bexar districts in 1876. Bavarian Heinrich Schmidtt (Henry “Hank” Clay Smith) and his wife Elizabeth Boyle and their six children became the first permanent settlers in the area in 1878; Hank was active in the county's organization.

Confederate veteran Paris Cox first visited the Caprock Escarpment of the Llano Estacado with a group of buffalo hunters in 1879.  Estacado was named the county seat in 1886. By 1900, the beef industry was thriving, supporting 30,618 head.

The country and western song (Ghost) Riders in the Sky was inspired by a legend of a stampede that took place in Crosby County in 1889 reference https://texashillcountry.com/legend-ghost-riders/

In 1908, the Bar-N-Bar Ranch began selling acreage to farmers.

Crosbyton became the new county seat in 1910. Some  in the county were planted in cotton, and 15,000 apple and peach trees were growing in the county in 1920. By 1929, farmers owned 83,000 chickens and sold 395,000 dozen eggs that year.

The first soil conservation district in the county was formed in 1941. In 1955, oil was discovered in the county.

Geography

Major highways
  U.S. Highway 62
   U.S. Highway 82/State Highway 114
  State Highway 207

Adjacent counties
 Floyd County (north)
 Motley County (northeast)
 Dickens County (east)
 Kent County (southeast)
 Garza County (south)
 Lynn County (southwest)
 Lubbock County (west)
 Hale County (northwest)

Geographic features
 Blanco Canyon
 White River, Silver Falls
 Mount Blanco
 Caprock Escarpment

Demographics

Note: the US Census treats Hispanic/Latino as an ethnic category. This table excludes Latinos from the racial categories and assigns them to a separate category. Hispanics/Latinos can be of any race.

As of the census of 2000, 7,072 people, 2,512 households, and 1,866 families resided in the county.  The population density was eight people per square mile.  The 3,202 housing units averaged four per square mile.  The racial makeup of the county was 63.77% White, 3.89% Black or African American, 0.54% Native American, 0.03% Asian, 0.07% Pacific Islander, 29.89% from other races, and 1.81% from two or more races.  About 48.93% of the population was Hispanic or Latino of any race.

Of the 2,512 households, 35.6% had children under the age of 18 living with them, 59.0% were married couples living together, 11.4% had a female householder with no husband present, and 25.7% were not families. About 23.8% of all households were made up of individuals, and 13.4% had someone living alone who was 65 years of age or older.  The average household size was 2.78 and the average family size was 3.30.

In the county, the population was distributed as 30.7% under the age of 18, 8.5% from 18 to 24, 24.0% from 25 to 44, 21.1% from 45 to 64, and 15.6% who were 65 years of age or older.  The median age was 34 years. For every 100 females, there were 91.1 males.  For every 100 females age 18 and over, there were 87.2 males.

The median income for a household in the county was $25,769, and for a family was $29,891. Males had a median income of $23,775 versus $17,229 for females. The per capita income for the county was $14,445.  About 22.6% of families and 28.1% of the population were below the poverty line, including 36.6% of those under age 18 and 22.7% of those age 65 or over.

Communities

Cities
 Crosbyton (county seat)
 Lorenzo
 Ralls

Unincorporated communities
 Cone
 Kalgary

Ghost towns
 Canyon Valley
 Estacado (partly in Lubbock County)

Education
School districts serving the county include:
 Crosbyton Consolidated Independent School District
 Lorenzo Independent School District
 Petersburg Independent School District
 Ralls Independent School District

The county is in the service area of South Plains College.

Gallery

Politics
Republican Drew Springer Jr., a businessman from Muenster in Cooke County, has since January 2013 represented Crosby County in the Texas House of Representatives.

See also

 Llano Estacado
 Mount Blanco
 Farm to Market Road 2591
 List of museums in West Texas

 National Register of Historic Places listings in Crosby County, Texas
 Recorded Texas Historic Landmarks in Crosby County
 Yellow House Canyon

References

External links
 Panhandle-Plains Historical Museum
 Crosby County government’s website
 
 Crosby County Profile from the Texas Association of Counties
 Photos of the Llano Estacado

 
1886 establishments in Texas
Populated places established in 1886
Majority-minority counties in Texas